Fatal Fury 2, known as  in Japan, is a 1992 fighting video game released by SNK for the Neo Geo arcade and home platforms, and later ported to several other home systems. It is the sequel to Fatal Fury: King of Fighters (1991) and the second game in the Fatal Fury franchise. Its updated version, Fatal Fury Special, was released in 1993.

The game introduced Kim Kaphwan, the first Taekwondo and the first Korean character in fighting games, and Mai Shiranui, one of SNK's mascots, their primary sex symbol, and one of the most well-known female video game characters. Both of them went on to become mainstays in both Fatal Fury games as well as The King of Fighters series.

Gameplay 

Fatal Fury 2 was the second game in SNK's 100-Mega Shock series, offering improved graphics and gameplay over the original Fatal Fury: King of Fighters. The play controls were modified, this time making full use of the Neo-Geo's four button configuration, by including four attack buttons (Light Punch, Light Kick, Strong Punch, and Strong Kick). The player can also dash back from the opponent to retreat by quickly tapping the lever backwards twice.

The two-plane battle system from the first Fatal Fury has been retained. This time, the player can move freely to the adjacent plane by pressing the Light Punch and Light Kick buttons simultaneously for the "Plane Move". The player can also perform a "Power Attack" that will knock the opponent to the other plane. When the opponent is on the other plane, the player can press either a punch button to jump towards the opponent with a "Low Plane Move Attack" or either a kick button for a "High Plane Move Attack". Certain stages have hazards in the background plane, such as electrified wires or a stampede of bulls, and thus the player cannot change planes but can knock the opponent to the other plane to cause extra damage.

Other specialized techniques have been added as well. After the player guards an opponent's attack, they can follow it up with a special counterattack technique known as an "Evasion Attack". The player can also taunt the opponent by pressing the Strong Punch button from a distance. Fatal Fury 2 also introduces the "Desperation Move" (or "Fury"), a powerful type of Special Move which causes massive damage that can only be used when the player's life gauge is at 25% and flashing red.

The single-player mode has the player facing against all eight characters (including a clone of the player's character), followed by four non-playable boss characters. After every fourth match, the player will participate in a bonus round for more points.

Plot
This next saga takes place after the ending of the original Fatal Fury, where Geese Howard meets his demise on 13 August 1991 by getting jump kicked from a high rise by the new and undefeated champion of the "King of Fighters" tournament "Terry Bogard", during a final fight to the death between the two in Geese's Tower. During the next year in 1992, a muscle-bound, mysterious nobleman becomes the sponsor of the new K.O.F. competition. This time, the rules are now changed such as being one-on-one per fight, and the tournament went from being several Southtown-only street fights to being a series of worldwide combat circuits with fighters both veterans and newcomers from around the globe competing with ambitions of their own, as well as befriending each other. As the single-player mode progresses, the mysterious challenger begins defeating the participants from the first Fatal Fury game, searching for the man responsible for defeating Geese.

Fighters
The character roster consists of eight selectable warriors: Terry, Andy and Joe from the original Fatal Fury, plus five newcomers. After defeating all eight playable characters in the single player tournament (including a clone of the player's character), the player faces four non-playable bosses.

Playable fighters:
 Terry Bogard - an American champion of the King of Fighters from South Town.
 Andy Bogard - Terry's younger brother and fellow ninjutsu practitioner alongside Mai Shiranui.
 Joe Higashi - a Japanese Muay Thai champion, and a friendly rival of the Bogard brothers.
 Big Bear - an Australian face wrestler, formerly a heel wrestler known as Raiden from the previous King of Fighters tournament.
 Jubei Yamada - an elderly Japanese judo sensei once known as "Yamada the Demon" during his handsome youth.
 Cheng Sinzan - a greedy and overweight shih-fu of taiji from Taiwan who is seeking to open his own training hall.
 Kim Kaphwan - a taekwondo kwanjang from South Korea, who fights in the name of justice.
 Mai Shiranui - a beautiful kunoichi who is the daughter of the Shiranui ninja clan's leader and is the self-proclaimed "fiancée" of Andy.

Bosses:
 Billy Kane - a bojutsu master from the United Kingdom who is seeking revenge on both the Bogard brothers and Joe for the death of Geese.
 Axel Hawk - a retired heavyweight boxing champion seeking to make his comeback.
 Laurence Blood - a former matador who uses a fighting style based on his bullfighting methods.
 Wolfgang Krauser - a German nobleman seeking to defeat the K.O.F. champion who is responsible for Geese's downfall.

Release

Home versions
In addition to the Neo-Geo AES and Neo-Geo CD home versions, a port of Fatal Fury 2 was released for the Sharp X68000 in Japan in 1993, followed by versions for the Sega Genesis / Mega Drive, PC Engine CD, SNES and Game Boy in early 1994. The SNES and Genesis versions were published by Takara, while the X68000 version, released only in Japan, was published by Mahou Kabushikigaisha (Magical Company). All three versions allow the player to control the four boss characters via their own respective codes. The PC Engine version was published by Hudson Soft only in Japan and was one of the first games to require the Arcade Card add-on. To coincide with the Japanese release of the SNES version, Hori Electric released a special controller called the Fatal Fury 2 Commander which has the power and super power moves of all the game's playable characters programmed in so that they can be triggered with a single button.

The original Neo Geo version of the game was later included in 2006's Fatal Fury: Battle Archive Volume 1 for the PlayStation 2 (with a choice between the original AES and CD soundtrack). It was also made available on the Wii's Virtual Console service in 2008.

Related media
Several licensed tie-ins were released for the game in Japan, including:
 Garou Densetsu 2 (餓狼伝説2) (PCCB-00111), a soundtrack CD from Pony Canyon;
 Garou Densetsu 2 (餓狼伝説2) (Gamest Extra No.91), a magazine-book from Shinseisha;
 Garou Densetsu 2 (餓狼伝説2 (Gamest Video Vol.2)), a VHS guide from Shinseisha;
 Garou Densetsu 2 (1) Mondo Kei (餓狼伝説2 (1) MONDO.恵) and Garou Densetsu 2 (2) Mondo Kei (餓狼伝説2 (2) MONDO.恵), two-part official manga adaptation by Mondo Kei from Shinseisha;
 Garou Densetsu 2 4-Koma Ketteiban (餓狼伝説2 4コマ決定版) (Games Comics 4), a 4-koma manga compilation by various authors from Shinseisha;
 Garou Densetsu 2 Fan Book (餓狼伝説2 ファンブック), a tribute book from Hippon Super;
 Garou Densetsu 2 Hisshō Kōryaku Hō (餓狼伝説2 必勝攻略法), a guide book from Futabasha;
 Garou Densetsu 2 Hisshō Kōryaku Hon (餓狼伝説2 必勝攻略本) (Haoh Game Special 1), a SNES guide book from Kodansha;
 Garou Densetsu 2 Oku Waza Densho Hen (餓狼伝説2 奥技伝承編) (PCVP-11177), a VHS tape from Pony Canyon.

Nettou Garou Densetsu 2
The Game Boy version is titled  and was released exclusively in Japan in 1994. This port features "super deformed" style graphics and, like the SNES, Mega Drive/Genesis, and Sharp X68000 ports, allows the player to use the four boss characters. However, due to the Game Boy's limited hardware, all voices have been removed, but in their place the characters have speech bubbles when performing a special attack or Desperation Move. This port also features support for the Super Game Boy peripheral for the SNES. In the Game Boy version, the text in the intro, post match dialogue, and character endings are in Japanese, while the character names, game credits, and menus are in English.

Fatal Fury Special

 was developed and published by SNK and originally released for the Neo Geo arcade and home platforms in 1993. It is an updated version of Fatal Fury 2, introducing several changes to the gameplay system while expanding the available character roster.

Reception

Commercial performance
In Japan, Game Machine listed Fatal Fury 2 on their 1 February 1993 issue as being the most-successful table arcade unit of the month. It went on to be Japan's second highest-grossing arcade game of 1993, just below Street Fighter II: Hyper Fighting. In North America, RePlay reported Fatal Fury 2 to be the fourth most-popular arcade game in February 1993, and Play Meter listed Fatal Fury 2 as the thirteenth most-popular arcade game in March 1993.

The Super Famicom (Super NES) version topped the Japanese Famitsu sales chart in December 1993.

Contemporary reviews
Fatal Fury 2 was generally very well-received by Western game critics upon its release. GamePro review of the Neo Geo version praised the "action-packed" gameplay, "Street Fighter-tough" challenge, "great" character graphics and animation, "slick scrolling" backgrounds, and "fantastic" sound, concluding it to be an "awesome sequel" that "ranks up there with the Numero Uno fighting game."

GamePro also praised the Genesis version for its six-button controller support and character graphics. They regarded the music as dull but assessed that the game "faithfully mimics the Neo Geo version and knocks Fatal Fury Genesis out of the ring." Reviewing the Genesis version, Electronic Gaming Monthly (EGM) criticized the sound effects but gave the overall assessment that "all the fighters, all the stages, and extra options not in the arcade (like a speed setting) make this another fine conversion of a Neo Geo title."

Reviewing the SNES version of the game, EGM called it "one of the better fighting games ported to the SNES" and awarded it Game of the Month. GamePro gave the SNES version a more mixed review, comparing it favorably with its predecessor, but stating that the graphics are inferior to the Neo Geo version, the audio is terrible, the controls are unreliable, and the gameplay is unbalanced. The magazine recommended that Fatal Fury fans instead hold out for the upcoming SNES port of Fatal Fury Special, which they felt to be far superior judging by the pre-release version they had seen.

Retrospective reviews

In a retrospective review, Maximum assessed that while still not as strong as Street Fighter II, Fatal Fury 2 was a dramatic improvement over the first game: "The number of characters selectable had been extended to eight, and all of them received a full complement of moves and fought with a much greater fluidity than in Fatal Fury." They also noted better background graphics and greater interaction with the scenery.

Accolades

In 2011, Complex ranked Fatal Fury 2 as the 35th best fighting game of all time, largely for introducing Mai Shiranui. Mega magazine ranked the game at #46 on their "Top 50 Mega Drive Games of All Time" in 1994. In 1995, Total! ranked the game 82nd on their Top 100 SNES Games. IGN listed Fatal Fury 2 63rd in it’s "Top 100 SNES Games of All Time."

References

External links 
 Fatal Fury 2 at GameFAQs
 Fatal Fury 2 at Giant Bomb
 Fatal Fury 2 at Killer List of Videogames
 Fatal Fury 2 at MobyGames

1992 video games
ACA Neo Geo games
Arcade video games
D4 Enterprise games
Fatal Fury
Fighting games
Game Boy games
Hudson Soft games
Magical Company games
Multiplayer and single-player video games
Neo Geo games
Neo Geo CD games
Nintendo Switch games
PlayStation Network games
PlayStation 4 games
Sega Genesis games
X68000 games
SNK games
SNK Playmore games
Super Nintendo Entertainment System games
TurboGrafx-CD games
Video games scored by Masahiko Hataya
Virtual Console games
Video games developed in Japan
Xbox One games
Hamster Corporation games